Godfrey II may refer to:

 Godfrey II, Duke of Lower Lorraine (965–1023)
 Godfrey II, Count of Louvain (ca. 1110 – 13 June 1142)